Vltaviellidae is an extinct taxonomic family of fossil sea snails, marine, gastropod molluscs in the clade Cyrtoneritimorpha. There are two subfamilies, the Vltaviellinae and the Krameriellinae.

Genera
Genera within the family Vltaviellidae include:
 Vltaviellinae
Vltaviella
Eifelcyrtus
 Krameriellinae
Krameriella
Soetenichia

References

 Paleobiology database info

Prehistoric gastropods